Ford Ice Piedmont is the large ice piedmont lying northward of Dufek Massif and the Forrestal Range between the lower ends of Foundation Ice Stream and Support Force Glacier, in the Pensacola Mountains of Antarctica. It was named by the Advisory Committee on Antarctic Names after Arthur B. Ford, a geologist of the United States Geological Survey (USGS), Menlo Park, CA. He was co-leader (with Peter F. Bermel) of the USGS party in the Thiel Mountains, 1960–61 (leader 1961–62); did field work at Lassiter Coast, 1970–71; led geological parties to the Pensacola Mountains in 1965–66, 1973–74, 1976–77, and 1978–79.

References 

Ice piedmonts of Antarctica
Bodies of ice of Queen Elizabeth Land